The Schlicker Seespitze, at , is the highest peak in the  Kalkkögel range in Austria's Stubai Alps, as well as the southwestern cornerstone of the chain. This mountain, known for being extremely prone to landslides, is a good observation point. It is located near the village of Schlick.
 
From Schlick, the mountain appears like a deeply clefted rock massif with a huge southern arête crowned by the rock pinnacles of the Schlicker Manndln. From the other side it resembles a crumbling, gashed peak rising above its scree slopes. The isolated Seejoch tower 
soars prominently over the Seejöchl saddle.

Ascents 
From Seejöchl (reached from the Adolf Pichler Hut or from Schlick) a well-marked grade I climb runs through boulder terrain up to the Seespitzscharte col between the Seespitze and Riepenwand, along the north arête and over it briefly to the summit. Climbers should beware of rockfalls to which they are exposed for the entire route.

In addition, there are several Alpine climbing routes of up to grade VII+, of which some were opened by well known Alpinists like Ludwig Purtscheller, Andreas Orgler and Mathias Rebitsch. The crossing from the Schlicker Manndl is popular; this grade IV route runs from the Schlicker Schartl up to the top.

Literature

External links 

Two-thousanders of Austria
Mountains of the Alps
Mountains of Tyrol (state)
Stubai Alps